Olimpio Bizzi (1 August 1916 – 3 August 1976) was an Italian racing cyclist, who won 13 stages of Giro d'Italia in 1936–1946, as well as the 1950 Tour du Maroc. He rode the 1947 Tour de France, and placed sixth in the 1947 Paris–Roubaix.

References

External links

 

1916 births
1976 deaths
Italian male cyclists
Sportspeople from Livorno
Cyclists from Tuscany